The Big Island National Wildlife Refuge Complex is a protected wildlife refuge administered by the U.S. Fish and Wildlife Service located on Hawaii Island (commonly known as the Big Island) in the state of Hawaii.  It consists of Hakalau Forest on the windward side of Mauna Kea and Kona Forest on the western side of Mauna Loa.

Units
Hakalau Forest National Wildlife Refuge

References

External links
Directory listing for the complex

Protected areas of Hawaii (island)
National Wildlife Refuges in Hawaii